Alanno is a comune and town in the province of Pescara in the Abruzzo region of Italy.

The first settlement of Alanno dates probably from the medieval  Lombard domination. Later it was a possession of the heirs of Ettore Fieramosca.

Main sights

The most important landmark of Alanno is the Renaissance church of Santa Maria delle Grazie, built around 1485,  it was said that the Madonna  appeared to a shepherd and asked him to organize the building of a church on that position overlooking the valley.  The church was built  outside the town. It has an elegant portal (1505) surmounted by a lunette with a fresco of the Deposition. The single nave ends with an apse with frescoes attributed to Andrea De Litio's workshop (1522) and a 15th-century triptych with Madonna, Angels and Saints.
The decoration of the interior is otherwise in Baroque style. The altar, finished in 1642, has a precious 15th century triptych with the Madonna between St. Sebastian and a Holy Pope.

Other points of interest include the three towers, remains of the medieval walls and castle, the 16th century church of St. Francis and the Wildlife Oasis of Alanno, characterized by numerous birds species and a rich river vegetation.

Cities and towns in Abruzzo